Rhys Tyler (born 18 June 1992) is an English semi-professional footballer who plays for Hungerford Town as a left back.

Career
Tyler began his career with the youth team of Reading, joining at the age of 8. After being released by Reading, he played professionally in Germany with Rot-Weiß Erfurt and Rot-Weiß Oberhausen. He returned to England with Hungerford Town in August 2015. He made 46 league appearances in his first season with the club, scoring 6 goals. He moved to Wealdstone in May 2018. On 22 June 2019,  Tyler signed for National League South side Chippenham Town. In October 2020, Tyler rejoined Hungerford Town.

References

1992 births
Living people
Sportspeople from Reading, Berkshire
English footballers
Reading F.C. players
FC Rot-Weiß Erfurt players
Rot-Weiß Oberhausen players
Wealdstone F.C. players
Hungerford Town F.C. players
3. Liga players
Association football fullbacks
English expatriate footballers
English expatriate sportspeople in Germany
Expatriate footballers in Germany
Chippenham Town F.C. players
Footballers from Berkshire